Mount Cocks in Antarctica is a mountain at the head of the Koettlitz Glacier in southern Victoria Land, Antarctica. The summit, which is  ASL, is  NNE of the junction of the Cocks and Skelton Glaciers at the southern end of the Royal Society Range.

Discovered by the BrNAE (1901–04) which named it for E.L. Somers Cocks, then Treasurer of the Royal Geographical Society.

Sources 
 USGS Mount Discovery map sheet ST 57-60/10

Royal Society Range
Mountains of Victoria Land
Scott Coast